Moglie e marito is a 2017 Italian comedy film directed by Simone Godano.

Cast 
 Pierfrancesco Favino - Andrea
 Kasia Smutniak - Sofia
 Marta Gastini - Maria
 Andrea Bruschi - Brancati

References

External links 

2017 comedy films
Italian comedy films
2010s Italian films
2010s Italian-language films
Body swapping in films